Jean-Sébastien is a French masculine given name. Notable people with the name include:

 Jean-Sébastien Aubin (born 1977), Canadian professional ice hockey goaltender
 Jean-Sébastien Fecteau (born 1975), Canadian figure skater
 Jean-Sébastien Giguère (born 1977), retired French-Canadian professional ice hockey player
 Jean-Sébastien Jaurès (born 1977), French football player
 Jean-Sébastien Lavoie (born 1978), French Canadian singer
 Jean-Sébastien Vialatte (born 1951), member of the National Assembly of France

See also 
 Jean (male given name)
 Sébastien

Compound given names
French masculine given names